Kibitzer is a Yiddish term for a person who offers (often unwanted) advice or commentary, especially a spectator of mind sports

The terms may refer to:
 The Kibitzer, a 1930 American comedy film
 Bernie Kibbitz, from list of All That characters, portrayed by Josh Server
 Sid Kibbitz, from list of Doonesbury characters